UMassFive College Federal Credit Union is a non-profit financial co-operative headquartered in Hadley, Massachusetts. It was started by employees of the University of Massachusetts to service UMass Amherst and immediate family. Membership was expanded to cover the Five College Consortium in 1971. Over the years they have expanded membership to many local businesses and groups.

UMassFive is a member of the National Credit Union Administration (NCUA), the CO-OP credit union network and the SUM ATM network.

In 2015 UMassFive was voted Best Credit Union in the Pioneer Valley for the ninth year in a row.

References

Credit unions based in Massachusetts
University of Massachusetts Amherst
1967 establishments in Massachusetts